Foxi Kéthévoama (born 30 May 1986) is a Central African footballer.

Career
Born in Bangui, Kéthévoama began playing club football with local side DFC 8ème Arrondissement before moving abroad to play professionally.  In February 2012, Kéthévoama joined Astana on loan from Kecskeméti TE on a year-long loan deal, making the move permanent the following January.

He scored his first international goals in the Central African Republic's 2–0 victory over Botswana on 2 June 2012, the nation's first ever win in FIFA World Cup qualifying.

On 26 July 2016, Kéthévoama signed a two-year contract with Balıkesirspor.

Career statistics

Club

International

Statistics accurate as of match played 2 December 2019

International goals
Scores and results list Central African Republic's goal tally first.

References

External links
Profile at HLSZ 

1986 births
People from Bangui
Living people
Central African Republic footballers
Association football midfielders
Central African Republic international footballers
FC 105 Libreville players
Diósgyőri VTK players
Újpest FC players
Kecskeméti TE players
FC Astana players
Gaziantep F.K. footballers
Balıkesirspor footballers
Nemzeti Bajnokság I players
Kazakhstan Premier League players
TFF First League players
Central African Republic expatriate footballers
Central African Republic expatriate sportspeople in Gabon
Expatriate footballers in Gabon
Central African Republic expatriate sportspeople in Hungary
Expatriate footballers in Hungary
Central African Republic expatriate sportspeople in Kazakhstan
Expatriate footballers in Kazakhstan
Central African Republic expatriate sportspeople in Turkey
Expatriate footballers in Turkey